Al-Baqa'a Club is a professional football club based in Ain Al-Basha District, Balqa Governorate, Jordan. It was formed by a Palestinian Baqa'a refugee camp  in 1968. The club is currently owned by Husni Jallad, Abdulla Mustafa and Khaled Mustafa. The club has various sponsorships with the biggest being Aya's Knafeh which supplies Ottawa, Ontario, Canada with the highest quality of Knafeh. FTATRONIX INC has been another partner of the club, being responsible for the digital marketing and broadcasting.

Stadium
Al-Baqa'a plays their home games at Amman International Stadium in Amman. The stadium was built on 1964 and opened on 1968, it is owned by The Jordanian government and operated by The higher council of youth. It is also the home stadium of Jordan national football team, Al-Jazeera and Al-Faisaly. It has a current capacity of 17,619 spectators.

Kits
Al-Baqa'a's home kit is all black shirts and shorts, while their away kit is all white shirts and shorts.

Kit suppliers and shirt sponsors

Honours
 Jordan FA Cup

 Runners-up (2): 1980, 2013–14
 Jordan FA Shield

 Runners-up (2): 2001, 2008
 Jordan Super Cup

 Runners-up (1): 2014

Current squad

Managerial history
  Issa Al-Turk (2003–04)
  Anwar Abdalqader (2008–09)
  Abdelrahman Idris (2009–10)
  Issa Al-Turk (2010)
  Taha Abdul-Jalil (2010–11)
  Khadr Badwan (2011–12) &  Khaled Awad (2011)
  Tamam Hourani (2012)
  Khadr Badwan (2012–13)
  Tariq Al-Sawi (2013)
  Sherif El-Khashab (2013–14)
  Khadr Badwan (2014)
  Taha Abdul-Jalil (2014)
  Khadr Badwan (2014)
  Akram Ahmad Salman (2014–2015)
  Khadr Badwan (2015)
  Adnan Awad (2015)
  Thair Jassam (2015–2016)
  Ahmed Daham Karim (2016)
  Ammar Al-Zuraiki (2016)
  Issa Al-Turk (2016)
  Emad Khankan (2016–2017)
  Sherif El-Khashab (2017–2018)
  Rateb Al-Awadat (2018–2019)
 Abduallah ALkatati (2019) 
Ibrahim Helmi(2019-2021)
Khadr Badwan (2021-

References

External links
 nationalfootballteams.com
 Soccerway

Football clubs in Jordan
Football clubs in Amman
1968 establishments in Jordan
Association football clubs established in 1968
Sport in Amman